Michael Fors Olson (born June 29, 1966) is an American prelate of the Roman Catholic Church. He has been serving as bishop of the Diocese of Fort Worth in Texas since 2013.

Early life and education
Michael Olson was born on June 29, 1966, in Park Ridge, Illinois, to Ronald G. and Janice (Fetzer) Olson.  He has three sisters. Olson was raised in Des Plaines, Illinois where he attended St. Mary's School. He then attended Quigley Preparatory Seminary North in Chicago.  When the Olson family moved to Fort Worth, Texas, Michael Olson resumed his seminary studies there.  

Olson earned a bachelor of arts and master's degrees in philosophy from The Catholic University of America in Washington, D.C.  He later received Master of Theology and Master of Divinity degrees  from the University of St. Thomas in Houston, Texas.  He received a Doctor of Moral Theology degree from the Alphonsian Academy in Rome.

Priesthood
Olson was ordained a priest by Bishop Joseph Delaney for the Diocese of Fort Worth on June 3, 1994. After his ordination, Olson served as the parochial vicar at St. Michael's Parish in Bedford, Texas, from 1994 to 1997. From 1997 to 2001, he was engaged in doctoral studies at the Center for Health Care Ethics in the Catholic Tradition at Saint Louis University in St. Louis, Missouri. Olson then served as a formation director at St. Mary's Seminary in Houston from 2001 to 2006. Olson served as the vicar general of the diocese from 2006 to 2008 and the rector of Holy Trinity Seminary in Irving, Texas from 2008 to 2013.  He was named a chaplain of his holiness, with the title monsignor, by Pope Benedict XVI in 2010.

Bishop of Fort Worth
Pope Francis named Olson as bishop of the Diocese of Fort Worth on November 19, 2013. He was consecrated on January 29, 2014, by Archbishop Gustavo García-Siller. Archbishop Emeritus Fiorenza and Bishop Kevin Vann were the co-consecrators.  The liturgy was celebrated in the Fort Worth Convention Center.

On September 20-23, 2018,  Olson and the Diocese of Fort Worth hosted the fifth National Encuentro of Hispanic/Latino Ministry for 3,000 national clergy and lay leaders in Hispanic ministry.

In 2018, Olson attracted controversy for seeking the resignation of Richard Kirkham, a priest in his diocese. Kirkham had learned that a priest in another diocese had an affair with a church employee, but did not report it to the diocese. The diocese accepted Kirkham's resignation on the grounds that he failed to report potential abuse of a "vulnerable adult." Kirkham sued the diocese for defamation, but later dropped the lawsuit.  Kirkham did not abide by the Diocese of Fort Worth Code of Ethics and Behavior which required reporting the incident to the bishop. Appeals to the Vatican ruled in favor of Olson and the Diocese of Fort Worth.

Olson is a panel member of American Religious Town Hall and a frequent radio guest on Guadalupe Radio Network and “The Catholic Current.”

See also

 Catholic Church hierarchy
 Catholic Church in the United States
 Historical list of the Catholic bishops of the United States
 List of Catholic bishops of the United States
 Lists of patriarchs, archbishops, and bishops

References

External links
Catholic Diocese of Fort Worth Official Site
Fort Worth Star-Telegram report on Richard Kirkham

Episcopal succession

 

1966 births
Living people
People from Park Ridge, Illinois
People from Fort Worth, Texas
University of St. Thomas (Texas) alumni
21st-century Roman Catholic bishops in the United States
Catholics from Texas
Catholics from Illinois
Bishops appointed by Pope Francis